Paul Berger (8 April 1889 – 30 March 1949) was a German sculptor. His work was part of the sculpture event in the art competition at the 1928 Summer Olympics. Severely injured during World War I, he died of long-term effects from his injuries in 1949.

References

1889 births
1949 deaths
20th-century German sculptors
20th-century German male artists
German male sculptors
Olympic competitors in art competitions
People from Zwickau
German military personnel killed in World War I